The Whitby Lawmen are a defunct Junior "A" ice hockey team from Whitby, Ontario, Canada.  They were a part of the Ontario Provincial Junior A Hockey League.

History
The Whitby Lawmen joined the OPJHL during its end-times Ontario Hockey Association Junior "A" Hockey League era.  After a rocky first season and with the league coming into some turmoil, the Lawmen chose to take a one-year leave from the league.  In 1986-87, the team took a look at the situation that the OJHL was in and decided it would be better to fold.  At the end of that season, the OJHL folded as well.

Season-by-season results

Playoffs
1985 DNQ

External links
OHA Website

References

Defunct ice hockey teams in Canada
Ice hockey teams in Ontario
Sport in Whitby, Ontario